Sudbury is a civil parish in the Derbyshire Dales district of Derbyshire, England.  The parish contains 37 listed buildings that are recorded on the National Heritage List for England. Of these, one is listed at Grade I, the highest of the three grades, two are at Grade II*, the middle grade, and the others are at Grade II, the lowest grade.  The parish contains the village of Sudbury and the surrounding countryside.  The most important building in the parish is Sudbury Hall, which is listed, together with associated structures in the garden and grounds.  Most of the other listed buildings are houses, cottages and associated structures, farmhouses and farm buildings.  The rest of the listed buildings include a church, a public house, shops, a set of stocks, a road bridge, a school, buildings for the Maynell Hunt, and a former gas works.


Key

Buildings

References

Citations

Sources

 

Lists of listed buildings in Derbyshire